Hugh Jeffery Ward is a convicted criminal in the United States responsible for one of the first known thefts of computer software in 1971; he stole a $25,000 USD data plotting program from Information Systems Design of Oakland, California.  Ward pleaded guilty to theft of trade secrets.

References

American prisoners and detainees
Living people
Year of birth missing (living people)
American computer criminals
American people convicted of theft